That Lucky Old Sun is the seventh studio album by Brian Wilson, released on September 2, 2008 by Capitol Records. It was written in collaboration with Wilson's bandmate Scott Bennett with spoken word poetry commissioned from Van Dyke Parks. As a concept album, the work largely derives from the 1949 song "That Lucky Old Sun", originally recorded by Frankie Laine.

Concept
Wilson describes the album as "consisting of five 'rounds', with interspersed spoken word". Its main theme is celebration of life in Southern California, harking back to the themes of Wilson's earlier work with The Beach Boys. "California Role" and numerous spoken interludes such as "Cinco de Mayo" and "Between Pictures" celebrate the unique culture of Venice Beach, the Los Angeles film industry and numerous Californian landmarks including the Capitol Tower and Hollywood Bowl. Rolling Stone called it a "musical love letter to his native Los Angeles".

A pervasive feeling of nostalgia and romance is visible in songs such as "Good Kind of Love", "Oxygen to the Brain" and "Forever She'll Be My Surfer Girl", which lyrically echoes the 1963 Beach Boys hit "Surfer Girl". The album also addresses Wilson's personal struggles in "Midnight's Another Day" and "Going Home".  "Going Home" dates back at least one decade to Wilson's sessions with Andy Paley. The 1940s' song "That Lucky Old Sun" originally made famous by Frankie Laine who had a number one hit with it in 1949, serves as the overture, and the Wild Honey-era outtake "Can't Wait Too Long" also briefly features.

Early demos of the tracks "Midnight's Another Day" and "Forever She'll Be My Surfer Girl" were released on Wilson's official website in August 2007. Live bootlegs and studio demos of the complete work also circulated on the Internet.

In 2009 a limited edition box set of That Lucky Old Sun was produced in England by Genesis Publications. The set was a collaboration with artist Peter Blake, and included twelve serigraphs by Blake each illustrating a song from the album as well as three facsimile sheets of music, a VIP pass and “one of the first pressings” of the That Lucky Old Sun CD.

Live performances
Originally commissioned by the Southbank Centre for its 2007 opening season, the work was debuted in a series of concerts at the Royal Festival Hall in London, England during September 2007. In January 2008 it was also performed at the State Theatre in Sydney, Australia for the Sydney Festival.

Reception

That Lucky Old Sun entered the UK Albums Chart at number 37 and the Billboard 200 at number 21. The album has sold 65,000 copies in the US as of April 2015. Based on 26 reviews, it has a score of 70 out of 100 on Metacritic, indicating "generally favorable reviews".

Track listing

Personnel

From the album's liner notes.
Brian Wilson – keyboards, piano, producer and lead vocals
Additional musicians

Charts

References

2008 albums
Albums produced by Brian Wilson
Brian Wilson albums
Capitol Records albums
Concept albums